Japanese collective unit E-girls have released five studio albums, one greatest hits compilation album, three live DVDs, 39 music videos, and 18 singles. E-girls are a unit composed of three sub-groups: Dream, Happiness and Flower, and three original members. Additionally, the band also incorporates two other units; Rabbits and Bunnies, who are yet-to-debut groups and serve under the management LDH, managed by Exile Hiro. They debuted with their single "Celebration!", which generated moderate success in Japan. Follow-up releases managed to achieve more notability, but their single "Follow Me!", became their first single to gain a certification by the Recording Industry Association of Japan (RIAJ)—receiving a double platinum award.

Their debut studio album, Lesson 1, was released in April 2013. After this, E-girls release "Gomennasai no Kissing You", their first single to achieve over 100,000 units in Japan, and was certified platinum for digital sales. Two more singles—"Kurukuru" and "Diamond Only"—was released, and their second album Colorful Pop (2014) premiered not long after. Between July–November 2014, the group released four singles; "E.G. Anthem: We Are Venus", "Odoru Ponpokorin", "Highschool Love", and "Mr. Snowman", the latter two which achieved a gold certification by the RIAJ.  Their third album, E.G. Time (2015), garnered success in Japan and was one of the highest earning releases that year.

The band continued to release three more singles in the new year—"Anniversary!!", "Dance Dance Dance", and "Merry x Merry Xmas"—all three that managed to gain commercial success. E.G. Smile: E-girls Best, the group's debut greatest hits compilation, was certified platinum by the RIAJ, but became their first record to miss the top spot on the Oricon Albums Chart. The band decided to release further material based on three concepts; E.G. Pop ("E.G. Summer Rider"), E.G. Cool ("Pink Champagne"), and Japanese Neo Girls ("Go! Go! Let's Go!"), the first two of which charted well on the Oricon Singles Chart. Their fourth record, E.G. Crazy, premiered in January 2017.

Albums

Studio albums

Live albums

Compilation albums

Remix albums

Video albums

Singles

Lead singles

Promotional singles

Guest appearances

Music videos

Official videos

Seifuku dance videos

Notes

References

External links
 E-girls Official discography 
 E-girls Official videography 

Discographies of Japanese artists
Pop music group discographies